Marotta is a surname of Italian origin. It may refer to:

People
Alessandro Marotta (b. 1986), Italian footballer
Alfonso Marotta (b. 1923), Italian former modern pentathlete
Angelo Marotta (b. 1937), American politician 
Erasmo Marotta (1565–1641), Italian composer
Florencia Marotta-Wurgler, American lawyer
Gabriele Marotta (b. 1967), Italian racing driver 
Giuseppe Marotta (b. 1957), Italian football executive
Ilya Espino de Marotta , Marine engineer and leader of the Panama Canal Expansion Project
Jerry Marotta (b. 1956), American musician, brother of Rick
Joseph Marotta, American producer
Renato Marotta (b. 1974), Italian actor
Rich Marotta, American sportscaster
Rick Marotta, American musician, brother of Jerry
Saverio Marotta (1911–1943), Italian naval officer during World War II
Ugo Marotta (b. 1942), Brazilian musician
Vincent Marotta (1924–2015), American businessman, investor and philanthropist

Other
Marotta, an American aerospace and defence company
Marotta (village), an Italian village in the Province of Pesaro and Urbino, Marche

Italian-language surnames